Scott A. McGregor (born 1956) is an American technology executive and philanthropist. He was the lead developer of Windows 1.0 (the first release of Microsoft Windows), he was the CEO of Philips Semiconductors from 2001to2004, and was the CEO of Broadcom from 2005 until its acquisition in 2016.

Early life and education

McGregor was born in and grew up in St. Louis, Missouri. He moved to Wilmington, Delaware during high school and graduated from Concord High School in 1974. While in Delaware, he competed and was named a runner-up in the 1974 Westinghouse Science Talent Search. Beginning in 1974, he attended Stanford University, where he studied computer science with a focus on artificial intelligence. He graduated in 1978 with a bachelor's degree in Psychology and a master's degree in Computer Science and Computer Engineering.

Career

1978–1998: Software industry

Starting in his senior year at Stanford, McGregor worked for Xerox Corporation’s Palo Alto Research Center (Xerox PARC). There, he joined a small software engineering team that helped create the windowing system for the Xerox Star—the first personal computer with a graphical user interface (instead of the text-based interfaces which preceded them). McGregor worked on the operating systems's windowing system (the "Cedar Viewers Window Systems"), the first system to display multiple programs at once.

In 1983, McGregor was recruited by Bill Gates to join Microsoft, to be the developer team lead for Windows 1.0—the company's first graphical user interface-based operating system. In this role, the authors of a 1994book said "his big-systems orientation" was seen as misaligned with the team's limited x86 PC environment, but described him as a "charismatic ideas guy" and an "articulate academic". At Microsoft at the time, Gates and McGregor interviewed every technical candidate. McGregor led the Interactive Systems Group, which began with a staff of three, characteristic of Microsoft's small development teams.

McGregor's first objective was to "figure out what Windows ought to be and deliver it to the world." At the time, Microsoft's proposed product didn't have a complete product specification, even though a press event was scheduled in November 1983 to announce it. McGregor flew with Gates and Steve Ballmer to New York's Plaza Hotel, where Windows was announced with support commitments from 23computer manufacturers. In a later interview, McGregor said Microsoft "basically announced the product when we hadn't even designed it yet."

Gates' initial perspective, in 1983, had been that the development would be just a set of subroutines that individual applications would add to enable windowing; at the time, the product was going to be called "Interface Manager". But McGregor had written the window manager component for PARC's complete, interactive programming environment, and had called his PARC software "Windows". As the project grew in scope, it was McGregor's term that became the name for Microsoft Windows. The team grew as well, expanding to more than 30members by the time they were fully staffed, making it Microsoft's single largest development group.

After leaving Microsoft, McGregor joined Digital Equipment Corporation (DEC, now part of HP) as the Program Architect for DECwindows, where he was the co-author of the X Window System, Version11 (also known as X11) in 1990 (the most current release as of 2020). He went on to lead DEC's Western Software Laboratory in Palo Alto, including the company's ULTRIX workstation software. In the mid-1990s, McGregor moved to Santa Cruz Operation, where he joined as the Senior Vice President of Products, and later became the company's Senior Vice President and General Manager.

1998–2016: Semiconductors

In 1998, McGregor was hired to lead Philips Semiconductors' Emerging Business unit, a newly-formed incubator where "promising technologies and products could be developed". The unit focused on rapidly growing markets such as networking, digital media, and RFID. By 2001, the unit had grown to nearly $1billion in sales; that September, he was promoted to be President and CEO of Philips Semiconductors (now NXP Semiconductors)—one of Philips' five main divisions at the time, and the world's sixth-largest semiconductor company, with 35,000 employees. The unit had been unprofitable for several years; under McGregor, the unit became profitable. McGregor resigned from the role in late 2004 citing a wish to return to the U.S. for his children's school, after living abroad. Philips CEO Gerard Kleisterlee said of McGregor's departure, "We regret to see him leave. He has led the Semiconductors division through one of the most difficult periods in its history and managed to turn it around successfully into a leaner business with a strong focus on innovation."

In October 2004, it was announced that McGregor would be hired as the next President and CEO of chipmaker Broadcom, one of the biggest producers of the chips used in communications equipment. McGregor took over from an interim CEO as the company sought to refocus after the departure of its co-founder and former CEO Henry Nicholas, and soon a $2.24billion stock options backdating scandal. In contrast with Nicholas, observers reported in 2006 that employees found McGregor "even-keeled", and said McGregor "prides himself on his organization," although a 2011 interview called him both "amiable" and "brutally honest." During McGregor's tenure, Broadcom grew from $2.4billion to $8.6billion in revenue and became a Fortune 500 company; it first entered the list in 2009, and climbed to spot #327 in 2013.

In a 2014 interview, McGregor commented on the semiconductor industry's scale: "It has never before been possible to get an order for 100 million of something," he said. "It also means it costs $100 million or more to start a new chip company, which is why you see an industry roll-up and no venture capitalists funding new ones." He retired in 2016 upon completing Broadcom’s $37billion acquisition by Avago—part of a wave of acquisitions in the semiconductor industry, and, at the time, the largest acquisition of a technology company ever.

Board memberships

McGregor has served on the board of a number of public companies, as well as industry and nonprofit organizations. McGregor served on the board of Progress Software from 1998to2008. During his tenure at Broadcom (from 2005to2016), McGregor also served on the company's board. From 2010to2016, McGregor served on the board of Ingram Micro (acquired in 2016 by China's HNA Group). From 2016 to 2017, McGregor served on the board of directors of Xactly Corporation (acquired in 2017 by Vista Equity Partners). In October 2017, McGregor was appointed to the board of Equifax as an independent director, after Equifax failed to defend a data breach of 143million U.S. consumers' digital information earlier that year. There, he joined its technology committee, which oversees cybersecurity. In 2018, McGregor was appointed to the board of Applied Materials, and in 2019, McGregor joined the board of Luminar Technologies, a company developing sensors for self-driving cars.

Awards
2013: McGregor was named by Glassdoor as one of 50 CEOs with the highest employee approval rating. 
2013: McGregor was named one of the top 100 CEO Leaders in STEM by STEMconnector. 
2013: McGregor received UCLA's Information Systems Executive Leadership Award.

Philanthropy

McGregor is a philanthropist focused on STEM education. In 2009, McGregor co-founded the Broadcom Foundation, and became the foundation's first president and chairman. The foundation sponsors initiatives such as the Broadcom MASTERS, the most prominent national science and engineering competition for middle school students around the world (the middle school variant of the Regeneron Science Talent Search, also hosted by the Society for Science & the Public). In creating the Broadcom Foundation, McGregor cited his own science fair involvement as a factor that contributed to his success.

Since 2015, the Broadcom MASTERS competition has awarded the Scott A. McGregor Leadership Award to one middle school student elected by their peers for their leadership qualities. The Broadcom Foundation said in 2015 that the award was named for McGregor because he had been a champion of the middle school competition "from its infancy in 2010, when it was just a 'big idea.'" At the award's inaugural awards ceremony, McGregor said to the competition's finalists, "I encourage you to continue your exploration and to never be afraid to challenge yourself with new ideas." After he retired from the Broadcom Foundation in 2016, McGregor joined the Board of Trustees of the Society for Science and the Public, the organization that runs both Broadcom MASTERS and the Regeneron Science Talent Search. McGregor is also one of two dozen members of the Raspberry Pi Foundation, and is a member of the Founding Circle of the B612 Foundation. McGregor has a minor planet named after him for his work supporting STEM education.

In 2019, Harvey Mudd College broke ground on the Scott A. McGregor Computer Science Center, a new, $30million building to house the college's growing Computer Science department. Scheduled for completion in spring of 2021, the  building also includes a  makerspace, a machine shop, teaching and research labs, and other community resources. The building is named for McGregor, who along with his wife, trustee Laurie Girand, was a major donor for the project.

As of 2020, McGregor serves on the board of regents for the Boys and Girls Clubs of Capistrano Valley.

Personal life

As of 2020, McGregor resides with his wife Laurie in Orange County, California. His pastimes include cooking and gardening, although a 2011 interviewer called his interests "extreme varieties of these comfortable-sounding pursuits." He is an avid orchid collector, having grown orchids since the age of 12. He maintains a collection of more than 500 different orchid species (along with related cloud forest and carnivorous plants) in a shade house at his home. He is an occasional speaker for various Southern California orchid societies.

See also 

 History of Microsoft Windows

References

1956 births
Living people
Businesspeople from St. Louis
Stanford University School of Humanities and Sciences alumni
Stanford University School of Engineering alumni
American chief executives